Permission Impossible: Britain's Planners is a British fly-on-the-wall television documentary series broadcast on BBC Two, which follows local council planning officers as they deal with applications for planning permission. It is the successor to The Planners.

Permission Impossible: Britain's Planners follows the work of council planning officers in the United Kingdom, including planners from Broxbourne Borough Council, Denbighshire County Council, Cheshire West and Chester Council, Stroud District Council and Torfaen County Borough Council.

The series, which consists of eight episodes, began on 25 February 2014 and was broadcast each week-night from Tuesday to Friday on BBC Two at 7pm, over a two-week period.

See also
The Planners 
The Planners Are Coming

References

External links

 

2014 British television series debuts
2014 British television series endings
BBC television documentaries
English-language television shows
Television series by BBC Studios
Town and country planning in the United Kingdom